The Dergholm State Park is located in the far west of Victoria, Australia. It is 390 km west of Melbourne and 450 km east of Adelaide, South Australia.

Introduction
The park has an area of 104 square kilometres and has a relatively dry range of habitat,
common throughout the hill country of western Victoria, Australia of woodlands, open forests, heaths and dry swamps, and is traversed by the Glenelg River. Biota include varied birds, reptiles, mammals, banksias, wattles, eucalyptus trees and other life forms. It was proclaimed a park in 1982.

Fauna
The sugar glider is a nocturnal possum that can glide from tree to tree using a membrane between its front and rear limbs. Other animals include echidnas, koalas, eastern grey kangaroos and various reptiles such as marbled gecko, eastern blue-tongued lizard and tiger snake. Birds include the red-tailed black cockatoo, swift parrot and powerful owl.

Flora
These include pink gum, yellow gum, brown stringybark, red gum, swamp riparian, clay heath, vegetation communities.

History
Aboriginal Kana gundidj clan inhabited the area until European arrival in 1830. The native population was quickly displaced by European farmers, but the area of the park saw little farming activity.

See also
 Protected areas of Victoria

External links
Parks Victoria

State parks of Victoria (Australia)
Protected areas established in 1982
1982 establishments in Australia
Parks of Barwon South West (region)